The Atiu swiftlet or Sawtell's Swiftlet (Aerodramus sawtelli) is a species of bird in the swift family, endemic to Atiu in the Cook Islands.

It is sooty-brown above, slightly lighter below.

Its natural habitats are the island's fernlands and mixed horticultural areas over which it feeds, and in makatea limestone caves within which it nests. The species is known on Atiu as kopeka.

References

External links

 
 
 
 

Atiu swiftlet
Birds of the Cook Islands
Atiu swiftlet
Taxonomy articles created by Polbot